William F. Bowen  (January 29, 1929 – April 22, 1999) was a member of the Ohio Senate, serving from 1970–1994, and a member of the Ohio Civil Rights Commission Hall of Fame. He also served in the Ohio House of Representatives from 1967-1970.

References

1929 births
1999 deaths
Democratic Party Ohio state senators
20th-century American politicians